John Cyril Stacey (7 November 1895 – 17 September 1964) was an English professional rugby league footballer who played in the 1910s and 1920s. He is a Halifax Hall Of Fame Inductee.

Playing career

International honours
Cyril Stacey was selected to go on the 1920 Great Britain Lions tour of Australasia, he won a cap for Great Britain while at Halifax in 1920 against New Zealand.

County honours
Cyril Stacey won caps for Yorkshire while at Halifax.

Challenge Cup Final appearances
Cyril Stacey played left-, i.e. number 4, in Halifax's 0-13 defeat by Leigh in the 1920–21 Challenge Cup Final during the 1920–21 season at The Cliff, Broughton on Saturday 30 April 1921, in front of a crowd of 25,000.

County Cup Final appearances
Cyril Stacey played right-, i.e. number 2, in Batley's 8-9 defeat by Wakefield Trinity in the 1924–25 Yorkshire County Cup Final during the 1924–25 season at Headingley Rugby Stadium, Leeds on Saturday 22 November 1924, in front of a crowd of 25,546.

Club career
Cyril Stacey played his last game for Halifax on Saturday 9 February 1929.

References

External links
Great Britain Statistics at englandrl.co.uk (statistics currently missing due to not having appeared for both Great Britain, and England)

1895 births
1964 deaths
Batley Bulldogs players
English rugby league players
Great Britain national rugby league team players
Halifax R.L.F.C. players
Rugby league fullbacks
Rugby league players from Halifax, West Yorkshire
Yorkshire rugby league team players